Daher (also stylised as DAHER) is a French industrial conglomerate. It is operational across the aerospace, defence, nuclear, and automotive industrial sectors in the fields of manufacturing, services, and transport.

It was founded in 1863 as a shipping company based in Marseille, France; within its first decade of operation, it was taken over by the Daher family, who have held a controlling stake in the company for over 100 years. During the first half of the twentieth century, Daher became a specialist as transporting outsized payloads, such as railway locomotives and industrial equipment, over long distance sea routes. It was increasingly chartered to undertake challenging tasks, becoming involved in the energy and aerospace sectors to handle logistics. By the end of the century, Daher was active around the world, being contracted to undertake logistical services to a variety of heavy industries.

During the twenty-first century, Daher has grown its presence within the aviation industry, acquiring both French general aviation manufacturer SOCATA and American aircraft company Quest Aircraft. In addition to manufacturing its own light aircraft range, it is also active as a subcontractor of aerostructures on behalf of several aerospace firms, including Airbus, Boeing, Dassault, and Gulfstream Aerospace. During the 2010s, Daher launched an intensive effort to expand its footprint in the Americas.

History
Daher was originally established in 1863 as a shipping company based in Marseille, France, by Alphonse Barban. In 1871, the company was taken over by Paul Daher. In 1880, one of the company's ships, the Herald of Morning completed the Marseille – San Francisco crossing in a record-breaking time of 100 days, achieved by going around Cape Horn.

In 1887, the company adopted the name Barban & DAHER. In 1920, Paul Daher's son, Gabriel, opened a branch of the firm to handle the charter sector. One year later, the firm operated its first route to the Middle East, supporting the construction of pipelines in the region; accordingly, Daher became a leader in the fast-growing energy market.

Throughout the 1920s and 1930s, it continued to expand its largescale transport activities. During the 1930s, Daher became a specialist in the transportation of locomotives and railway rolling stock by sea.

In 1972, the Daher group decided to involve itself in France's nuclear power industry, directly contributing to the construction of these nuclear power plants via the provision of three 550 tonne cranes.

During the late 1980s, Daher enlarged its presence in the global logistics sector, providing services for manufacturing, distribution and supply. During 1989, Daher began to transport outsize aircraft components on behalf of the multinational Airbus consortium, carrying payloads between Southampton, England and Toulouse, France.

The company took advantage of the end of the Cold War to seek out business in the east. In 1990, Daher participated in the construction of the first nuclear power plant in China built with French technology; the firm was made responsible for delivering all components to the construction site in Daya Bay. During 1994, the firm was awarded the contract to provide logistics management services for the Omsk refinery project in Siberia, Russia.

In 1999, Daher took over the aerospace and defense business Lhotellier Montrichard. Two years later, high pressure pipe fabricator Lacroix Lucaero became a part of Daher Group. In 2003, thermal insulation systems Manutex was also acquired by Daher. That same year, the company secured a major logistics contract with British engine manufacturer Rolls-Royce Plc to handle its RFID-based logistics system.

In 2007, Daher acquired the nuclear energy logistics company Nuclear Cargo + Services (NCS), based in Hanau, Germany; this purchase marked Daher's first major push into the nuclear sector. Subsequently, the American company Transport Logistics International, Inc. became a part of the Daher group on 1 January 2010.

On 27 June 2008, multinational European Aeronautic Defence and Space (EADS) announced its intention to sell a controlling interest in the general aviation manufacturer EADS Socata to Daher. On 3 November 2008, EADS and Daher announced that they had reached an agreement for Daher to acquire a 70% share of Socata. On 7 January 2009, Daher confirmed its acquisition of a majority 70% stake in SOCATA.

In 2010, Daher launched its operational base in Mexico, establishing a composites manufacturing factory in Nogales. On 7 September 2011, the Daher Group announced that it was undertaking the acquisition of valve and control specialists Vanatome and Verdelet, two key players in the supply of equipment for nuclear power plants.

In 2013, the Daher Group celebrated its 150 years of existence; in November of that same year, the firm announced the acquisition of the aeronautical equipment manufacturer Dyonix. Also in 2013, Daher becomes a major partner for the Airbus Helicopters H160 rotorcraft, becoming responsible designing and manufacturing the tail boom and distinctive fenestron anti-torque device. By this point, Daher was already an active aerostructures suppliers for multiple companies, including Airbus for its A350 XWB airliner, Dassault Aviation's Falcon 5x business jet, and Gulfstream Aerospace's Gulfstream G500/G600 business jet family.

In 2015, Daher underwent considerable management changes; for the first time in living memory, the firm was no longer directly managed by a member of the Daher family as then-CEO Patrick Daher began to transfer his responsibilities over to Didier Kayat. The firm's ownership remained unchanging, the Daher family holding a controlling stake of 80 per cent, while French public investment bank BPI owned the remaining 20 per cent.

In 2016, the company launched the improved TBM 930 turboprop aircraft; that same year, the 800th TBM came off the assembly line. That same year, Daher reinforces its presence in Mexico, opening a logistics base in Queretaro.

By 2017, the aerospace sector accounted for roughly 80% of Daher group's overall turnover, while the remainder was generated from its engineering and logistical support contracts for the French nuclear industry. That same year, the firm announced that its on-time delivery figures to Airbus, its biggest customer at the time, had risen from 85% to 99.7%.

In early 2018, the company secured its first contract with the American aerospace company Boeing to supply subassemblies for its 787 airliner; at the time, Daher's managing director, Didier Kayat, stated that it intended to be earning one third of its revenues with the Americas within five years. In June 2019, Daher announced its plan to purchase American general aviation company Quest Aircraft from Japanese firm Setouchi Holdings. During October of that year, the acquisition of Quest Aircraft was finalised, expanding Daher's North American footprint and merger its sales efforts with the former SOCATA's own.

Business lines

Aircraft manufacturer

Daher's aviation activity includes the design, manufacture and maintenance of the TBM and Kodiak single-engine turboprop aircraft. Daher also offers maintenance, repair and technical support of other aircraft in the same categories.

Aerospace systems & equipment
As an aircraft manufacturer, Daher developed three areas of expertise : metals, composite materials and assembly.

Daher designs and manufactures products for the aerospace market :
 Aerostructures : Wings & Empennages, Doors, Airframe, Fairings
 AeroEngines : Nacelles & pylons, Engine parts
 Aircraft Interiors : Floor covering, Cargo nets, Insulation Blankets, Air distribution systems.

Logistics and services

Daher designs and operates logistics, industrial and supply chain services for clients in aeronautics automotive and other industrial sectors.
 Industrial logistics: Daher design and operates inbound, outbound & aftermarket logistic flows for its client. 
 Manufacturing services: Daher realizes, in-situ or ex-situ, production assembly operations, quality control, repair or rework operations.
 Project services: transport for oversized and specific loads, as well as engineering associated services.
 Supply chain services: Daher provides on-demand engineering services in terms on supply chain design, procurement management, supplier development, production control & planning and transport & flow monitoring.

References

External links
 Daher official site

Aerospace companies of France
French brands
Manufacturing companies based in Marseille